Steve Kettering (born 1943) is the Iowa State Senator from the 26th District. A Republican, he has served in the Iowa Senate since 2003, when he won a special election to fill the vacancy left after Steve King was elected to Iowa's 5th congressional district.   He got his B.A. from Buena Vista College and his master's degree from California State University, Long Beach.

Kettering currently serves on several committees in the Iowa Senate - the Commerce committee; the Ethics committee; the Natural Resources committee; the Rules and Administration committee; the Appropriations committee, where he is the ranking member; and the Judiciary committee, where he is the ranking member.  His prior political experience includes serving as a representative in the Iowa House of Representatives from 1999 to 2003.

Kettering was last re-elected in 2008 with 22,970 votes, unopposed.

References

External links
Senator Jerry Behn official Iowa Legislature site
Senator Jerry Behn official Iowa General Assembly site
Senator Jerry Behn at Iowa Senate Republican Caucus
 

Republican Party Iowa state senators
Republican Party members of the Iowa House of Representatives
Living people
California State University, Long Beach alumni
People from Sac County, Iowa
Buena Vista University alumni
1943 births